The Douvenant Viaduct is a railway viaduct built between 1903 and 1905 for the Chemin de Fer des Côtes-du-Nord, between the French communes of Saint-Brieuc and Langueux. It was used by the Saint-Brieuc - Moncontour line and the Saint-Brieuc - Saint-Briac line. It was designed by Louis Auguste Harel de La Noë and is the grandest in a series of thirteen "grognet" type viaducts.

Dimensions
 Total length 
 Height 
 Curvature:

Future

The Association des Chemins de Fer des Côtes-du-Nord is constructing a heritage railway line that will use the viaduct.

External links 
  Douvenant Viaduct on the French Archives Départementales website

Viaducts in France
Bridges completed in 1905
Railway bridges in France
1905 establishments in France